"The Masks" is episode 145 of the American television series The Twilight Zone. It originally aired on March 20, 1964 on CBS. In this episode, set on Mardi Gras, a dying man coerces his relatives into wearing grotesque masks that reflect their true personalities.

Opening narration

Plot 
On the night of Mardi Gras, a wealthy old man named Jason Foster is attended to by his physician, Dr. Sam Thorne, who warns him that his death is imminent. Cranky and candid, Jason is not cheered by the arrival of his cowardly hypochondriac daughter, Emily Harper, and her family: greedy businessman husband Wilfred; oafish, sadistic son Wilfred Jr.; and vain daughter Paula.

After openly insulting the Harpers, Foster says he has a special Mardi Gras party planned for them that night. Following dinner, the family gathers in Foster's study, where he instructs them to put on special one-of-a-kind masks that he says were "crafted by an old Cajun". Explaining that an old Mardi Gras custom involves wearing a mask that is the opposite of one's true personality, Foster sarcastically gives a sniveling coward mask to Emily, a miserable miser to Wilfred, a twisted buffoon to Wilfred Jr., and a narcissist to Paula while he dons a skull mask, saying that it represents death as opposed to his life. The Harpers initially refuse to participate until Foster correctly accuses them of only being there to claim his fortune upon his death. As such, he informs them that his will is drawn up so that they inherit everything only if they wear their masks until midnight.

The Harpers reluctantly concede, but as the hours pass, they beg to remove their masks, saying that they are unbearable. However, Foster delivers a final tirade until the clock strikes midnight, calling them all caricatures before he dies. The Harpers rejoice in their newly inherited wealth and unmask, but discover to their horror that their faces now conform to the hideous features of their masks. Foster's face, on the other hand, proves to be superficially unchanged. Dr. Thorne observes, "This must be death. No horror, no fear, nothing but peace."

Closing narration

Cast
Robert Keith as Jason Foster
Milton Selzer as Wilfred Harper
Virginia Gregg as Emily Harper
Brooke Hayward as Paula Harper
Alan Sues as Wilfred Harper Jr.
Willis Bouchey as Dr. Samuel Thorne
Bill Walker as Jeffrey The Butler
Maidie Norman as Maid
Rod Serling as Host / Narrator – Himself

Episode notes
"The Masks" was directed by Ida Lupino, who had starred in the first-season episode "The Sixteen-Millimeter Shrine"; she was the only woman to direct an original episode of The Twilight Zone.

References

 DeVoe, Bill. (2008). Trivia from The Twilight Zone. Albany, GA: Bear Manor Media. 
 Grams, Martin. (2008). The Twilight Zone: Unlocking the Door to a Television Classic. Churchville, MD: OTR Publishing. 
 Zicree, Marc Scott: The Twilight Zone Companion. Sillman-James Press, 1982 (second edition)

External links
 

1964 American television episodes
The Twilight Zone (1959 TV series season 5) episodes
Television episodes written by Rod Serling